Josué Daniel Ayala (born 30 May 1988 in Buenos Aires), is an Argentine football goalkeeper, who currently plays for Sarmiento.

Career
Following the departure of goalkeeper Aldo Bobadilla in 2007, Ayala was promoted to the first team. Ayala was relegated to fourth goalkeeper behind Mauricio Caranta, Pablo Migliore and Javier García. On 17 March 2008, Ayala suffered an accident on the Dellepiane highway while traveling from the club to his house. He was also accompanied by Migliore, who had been with Ayala for a training session. This accident had no serious physical consequences for either goalie. In the second half of 2008, he began to be included in the first team squad due to Caranta's injuries. Ayala then ascended to become the third goalkeeper after Pablo Migliore departed to Racing Club.

Despite not playing, he won his first official title in 2008 when Boca beat Arsenal de Sarandi in the Recopa Sudamericana. He became the backup goaltender to Javier García midway through the 2008 Apertura and made his debut for Boca on December 23, 2008, in the second half of the final championship playoff game against Tigre, when García was forced to leave with an injury. It had been reported that after Boca had claimed the title Ayala was assaulted and stabbed in his home. The knife had only gone through muscle tissue, preventing a great tragedy.

In 2010, Ayala was loaned to second division side Independiente Rivadavia.

Honours

References

External links
 Argentine Primera statistics

Living people
1988 births
Association football goalkeepers
Footballers from Buenos Aires
Argentine footballers
Boca Juniors footballers
Independiente Rivadavia footballers
Atlético Tucumán footballers
Club Atlético Temperley footballers
Rosario Central footballers
Club Atlético Sarmiento footballers
Argentine Primera División players
Primera Nacional players